Carlos Alan Ortega Gastelum (born 17 February 1997 in El Fuerte, Sinaloa) is a Mexican professional footballer who played as a defender for Loros de la Universidad de Colima

References

External links
 

1997 births
Living people
Mexican footballers
Footballers from Sinaloa
Association football defenders
Loros UdeC footballers
Ascenso MX players
Liga Premier de México players
Tercera División de México players